The Don-2N radar (NATO: Pill Box) is a large missile defense and early warning active electronically scanned array radar outside Moscow, and a key part of the Russian A-135 anti-ballistic missile system designed for the defense of the capital against ballistic missiles. Each of its four faces has an  diameter Super high frequency band radar giving 360 degree coverage. To the right of each circular search and track array, separated by a vertical structure for shielding, is a square antenna array (edge length 10 m) for guiding the interceptor missile by data link. The system is run by an Elbrus-2 supercomputer.

It has a range of 3,700 km for targets the size of a typical ICBM warhead.

Under the 1972 Anti-Ballistic Missile Treaty both the United States and the Soviet Union had to designate one area to protect from missile attack. The USA chose North Dakota and the Soviet Union chose Moscow. The Don-2N radar is designed to be the control centre of the system and can operate autonomously if connection is lost to its command and control centre.

The 1998 SIOP targeted this radar facility with 69 consecutive nuclear weapons.

Don prototype
The prototype Don radar, called Don-2NP (NATO: Horse Leg) is in Sary Shagan test site in Kazakhstan, location .

References

Russian Space Forces
Russian and Soviet military radars
Military installations of Russia
Military installations of the Soviet Union
Military equipment introduced in the 1980s